Luís Henrique Pereira dos Santos (born 20 August 1968 in Jequitaí) more commonly known simply as Luís Henrique is a Brazilian footballer who played as a midfielder. He participated at two Copa América tournaments for Brazil in 1991 and 1993.

References

1968 births
Brazilian footballers
Brazil international footballers
Living people
1991 Copa América players
1993 Copa América players
Association football midfielders